Monond-e Bala (also Romanized as Monond-e Bālā; also known as Monond and Manūn) is a village in Qohestan Rural District, Qohestan District, Darmian County, South Khorasan Province, Iran. At the 2006 census, its population was 289, in 87 families.

References 

Populated places in Darmian County